The Baileys Harbor lighthouse is a lighthouse located near Baileys Harbor in Door County, Wisconsin.

Construction of Baileys Harbor Lighthouse began in 1852 and in 1853 David Ward became the first lighthouse keeper.  It was the third lighthouse constructed in Door County after the lighthouses on Rock Island and Plum Island.  An 1866 inspection declared the lighthouse was in "very defective condition" and in late fall of 1869 it closed.  This coincided with the opening of the Baileys Harbor Range Lights and the Cana Island Lighthouse in 1870 which replaced it.  Today the island is privately owned and the lighthouse is in decay but still standing.

It is one of four lighthouses in the country to have retained its bird-cage lantern.

Gallery

Notes

Further reading

 Havighurst, Walter (1943) The Long Ships Passing: The Story of the Great Lakes, Macmillan Publishers.
 Oleszewski, Wes, Great Lakes Lighthouses, American and Canadian: A Comprehensive Directory/Guide to Great Lakes Lighthouses, (Gwinn, Michigan: Avery Color Studios, Inc., 1998) .
 
 Sapulski, Wayne S., (2001) Lighthouses of Lake Michigan: Past and Present (Paperback) (Fowlerville: Wilderness Adventure Books) ; .
 Wright, Larry and Wright, Patricia, Great Lakes Lighthouses Encyclopedia Hardback (Erin: Boston Mills Press, 2006) .

External links
Seeing the light
Lighthouse friends article

Bailey's Harbor Light in Lighthouse Resources: Historic Lighthouses & Light Stations, United States Coast Guard, October 21, 2019

Lighthouses in Door County, Wisconsin
Lighthouses completed in 1852
1852 establishments in Wisconsin